Alaa Al Shbli (born 3 May 1990 in Deir ez-Zor, Syria) is a Syrian international footballer. He currently plays, which play in the Qatari Second Division, the top division in Qatar. He plays as a right wingback, wearing the shirt with number 15 for Al-Karamah. For the Syrian national football team, he is currently wearing the shirt with the number 20.
After he left Zamalek SC, he signed for Al-Masry SC, but left the club 2 days later, as Al-Masry would not agree to the same salary Alaa had in mind.
Alaa also is the third captain of the Syrian National team, as he is one of the oldest players in the current squad.

International career
Al Shbli played between 2007 and 2008 for the Under-17 and the Under-19 Syrian national team. He was a part of the Syrian U-17 national team in the FIFA U-17 World Cup 2007. in South Korea.
He played against Argentina, Spain and Honduras in the group-stage of the FIFA U-17 World Cup 2007 and against England in the Round of 16.

He played for the Syrian U-19 national team in the AFC U-19 Championship 2008 in Saudi Arabia and was a part of the Syrian U-23 national team in the Mediterranean Games 2009 in Italy.

He made his debut for the Syria national team in the 2009 Nehru Cup in India. Senior national coach Fajr Ibrahim called him up for the first time, and he debuted in Syria's opening match of the tournament against Kyrgyzstan on 20 August 2009. He came on as a substitute for Bakri Tarrab in the second half.

his last appearance for Syria was in November 2017, in friendly match vs Iraq.

Appearances in major competitions
Results list Syria's goal tally first.

W = Matches won; D = Matches drawn; L = Matches lost

International goals

Honours

Club
Al-Karamah
Syrian Premier League: 2008, 2009
Syrian Cup: 2008, 2009, 2010
Syrian Super Cup: 2008
AFC Cup: 2009 runner-up

Naft Al-Wasat
Iraqi Premier League:  2014–15

National team
FIFA U-17 World Cup 2007: Round of 16
Nehru Cup: 2009 runner-up

References

External links
 
 

1990 births
Living people
People from Deir ez-Zor
Syrian footballers
Association football defenders
Syria international footballers
Syrian expatriate footballers
Expatriate footballers in Iraq
Syrian expatriate sportspeople in Iraq
Expatriate footballers in Egypt
Syrian expatriate sportspeople in Egypt
Expatriate footballers in Qatar
Syrian expatriate sportspeople in Qatar
Al-Karamah players
Zakho FC players
Naft Al-Wasat SC players
Zamalek SC players
Najaf FC players
Mesaimeer SC players
Egyptian Premier League players
Qatari Second Division players
Syrian Premier League players